Gilbert Mayes was Dean of Lismore from 1961 until 1987.

He was born in 1915, educated at Trinity College, Dublin and  ordained in 1945. After a curacy in Armagh he held incumbencies at Donaghmore and Dundalk. He was the first secretary of Societas Liturgica.

References

1915 births
Alumni of Trinity College Dublin
Deans of Lismore
2005 deaths